The Toccatas for Keyboard, BWV 910–916, are seven pieces for clavier written by Johann Sebastian Bach. Although the pieces were not originally organized into a collection by Bach himself (as were most of his other keyboard works, such as the Well Tempered Clavier and the English Suites etc.), the pieces share many similarities, and are frequently grouped and performed together under a collective title.

History
The toccatas represent Bach's earliest keyboard compositions known under a collective title. The earliest sources of the BWV 910, 911 and 916 toccatas appear in the Andreas-Bach Book, an important collection of keyboard and organ manuscripts of various composers compiled by Bach's oldest brother, Johann Christoph Bach between 1707 and 1713. An early version of the BWV 912 (known as the BWV 912a) also exists in another collection compiled by Johann Christoph Bach known as the "Möller manuscript", from around 1703 to 1707. This indicates that most of these works originated no later than Bach's early Weimar years, though the early northern-German style indicates possible Arnstadt origin.

Composition
The works bear an early northern-German influence, with distinct contrasting sections and fugal passages ingrained into the rhapsodic material, as opposed to the more familiar, two-movement prelude and fugue format. Other early Bach works that follow this sectional, Buxtehude-influenced format include the Prelude (Toccata) and Fugue in E major, BWV 566, and Prelude and Fugue in A minor, BWV 551.

Though the specific instrumentation is not given for any of the works, they are all strictly manualiter, as none of them call for pedal parts. Like Bach's other clavier works, these toccatas are frequently performed on the piano. Because of some of the organ-like textures, the pieces are sometimes performed on the organ. In fact, the opening motifs of the BWV 912, 914 and 916 toccatas resemble the ones on the BWV 532, 534 and 541 organ preludes respectively.

The Seven Toccatas

Toccata in F-sharp minor, BWV 910
 (Toccata)
 [no tempo indication]
 Presto e Staccato (Fuga)
 [no tempo indication]
 (Fuga)
Toccata in C-minor, BWV 911
 (Toccata)
 Adagio
 (Fuga)
 Adagio
 (Fuga)
 Adagio / Presto
Toccata in D-major, BWV 912
 Presto
 Allegro
 Adagio
 [no tempo indication]
 Con Discrezione
 Fuga
Toccata in D-minor, BWV 913
 (Toccata)
 [no tempo indication]
 Presto
 Adagio
 Allegro
Toccata in E-minor, BWV 914
 (Toccata)
 Un Poco Allegro (a 4 voci.)
 Adagio
 Allegro – Fuga (a 3 voci.)
Toccata in G-minor, BWV 915
 (Toccata)
 Adagio
 Allegro
 Adagio
 Fuga
Toccata in G-major, BWV 916
 Presto
 Adagio
 Allegro (Fuga)

References

Work cited
Schulenberg, David (2006), The Keyboard Music of J.S. Bach (2nd ed.), Routledge, 
Williams, Peter (2003), The Organ Music of J. S. Bach (2nd ed.), Cambridge University Press,

External links
Toccatas for Clavichord, BWV 910–916: Scores at the International Music Score Library Project (IMSLP)
AllMusic links for BWV 910, BWV 911, BWV 912, BWV 913, BWV 914, BWV 915, and BWV 916.
Netherlands Bach Society links for BWV 911, BWV 912, BWV 913, and BWV 914.

Compositions by Johann Sebastian Bach
Compositions for keyboard
Compositions for harpsichord
Toccatas